This is a list of law enforcement agencies in the District of Columbia.

According to the US Bureau of Justice Statistics' 2008 Census of State and Local Law Enforcement Agencies, the District has six local law enforcement agencies employing 4,262 sworn police officers, about 722 for each 100,000 residents. This is the highest proportion of police officers to citizens of any state or territory.

Listed by age

The oldest agencies are the:
United States Marshals Service, founded September 24, 1789
United States Park Police, founded in 1791 as park watchmen to guard federal property in DC
United States Mint Police, founded in 1792 
United States Capitol Police, founded in 1828
Metropolitan Police Department of the District of Columbia, founded in 1861 (took the place of DC City Watch, founded in 1802)
United States Secret Service, founded July 5, 1865
 District of Columbia Protective Services Division, founded by Congress in 1899 under the Watchmen in Municipal Facilities Act

Primary DC law enforcement (local and federal) 

 District of Columbia Department of Corrections
 District of Columbia Housing Authority Police Department of Public Safety (Has city-wide jurisdiction throughout Metropolitan area)
 District of Columbia Metropolitan Police Department (local  municipal police covering all of DC with approximately 3,800 officers)
 District of Columbia Protective Services Division
 District of Columbia Public Schools Police - Law Enforcement Division (has city-wide jurisdiction on 119 DCPS owned and leased properties)
District of Columbia Public Library Police
 Metro Transit Police Department (has jurisdiction in Metro rail and near Metro bus stops in DC, VA, and MD; 526 officers)
 Metropolitan Washington Airports Authority Police (jurisdiction actually falls within specific locations in VA [Reagan National and Dulles airports]; formerly FAA Police)
 United States Marshals (deputies at the Superior Court of the District of Columbia fulfill duties similar to those of a sheriff in local court matters, while deputies at the United States District Court for the District of Columbia perform more traditional and federal district court duties)
 United States Park Police (national parks federal police for the National Mall, monuments, parkways, and all national park service properties in D.C and surrounding regions; several hundred officers; shares jurisdiction with D.C. Metropolitan Police in addition to exercising federal authority)
 Washington National Cathedral Police (officers licensed by the MPD as special police officers)
Washington Humane Society Law Enforcement (charted by Congress in 1870 to enforce the Districts anti-cruelty laws)

Federal police agencies with a uniformed presence in District of Columbia area 

The majority of federal law enforcement agencies have some type of jurisdiction and/or headquarter offices in the District of Columbia; however, some are more overt than others. 

Amtrak Police Department (quasi-federal, as Amtrak is government-owned) 
Armed Forces Retirement Home Police (located in northwest District of Columbia; an independent, executive-level federal agency with a force of fewer than a dozen police officers and investigators; formerly known as the United States Sailor's and Airman's Home and the Soldier's Home; established in 1834)
Bureau of Engraving and Printing Police 
Central Intelligence Agency Security Protective Service (Provides law enforcement and security services to CIA facilities in and around the District)
District of Columbia National Guard Military Police/Security Forces, if any (unique in that the DC Guard always answers to the President rather than to a governor)
Federal Bureau of Investigation Police (the FBI Police are the uniformed officers responsible for the protection of FBI facilities and employees) 
Federal Bureau of Prisons (United States Department of Justice)
Federal Protective Service (tasked with protection of federal facilities not otherwise protected by other agencies)
Government Publishing Office Police (formerly Government Printing Office Police)
Military Police (active and reserve of the various United States Armed Forces):  Military Police Corps (United States Army); Master-at-arms (United States Navy); United States Air Force Security Forces; USMC Military Police; and the United States Coast Guard and United States Coast Guard Police
Naval District of Washington Police (Responsible for the Washington Navy Yard, Anacostia, Bolling Air Base, Naval Research Lab, et al.)
Smithsonian Police and National Zoo Police (Smithsonian museums federal special police who maintain concurrent jurisdiction with the U.S. Park Police)
Supreme Court Police (Supreme Court Federal Police; under a hundred officers)
United States Capitol Police (Congressional Federal Police; many hundreds of officers)

United States Customs and Border Protection (CBP Officers enforce customs laws at Reagan National and Dulles International Airport, and at the Port of Washington)
United States Department of Veterans Affairs Police (VA Police, responsible for the District of Columbia, VA Medical Center)
U.S. Federal Reserve Police (the law enforcement arm of the Federal Reserve System, the central banking system of the US)
United States Mint Police (the law enforcement and protective service of the United States Mint, assigned to the US Mint Headquarters Facility)
National Gallery of Art Office of Protective Services (National Gallery of Art federal police and special police who maintain concurrent jurisdiction with U.S. Park Police)
United States Park Police
United States Pentagon Police (Pentagon Police also have jurisdiction at Department of Defense-leased property throughout the National Capital Region, and at the US Military Court of Appeals in District of Columbia) 
 United States Postal Police (uniformed division of United States Postal Inspection Service) 
United States Secret Service Uniformed Division (Uniformed Division was formerly known as the White House Police Force)

College and university agencies 

 American University Police Department
 Catholic University Department of Public Safety
 George Washington University Police (GWPD)
 Gallaudet University Department of Public Safety

 Georgetown University Police Department
 Howard University Campus Police
 University of the District of Columbia Police Department
 Trinity University Department of Public Safety

See also 
 Crime in Washington, D.C.
 Law enforcement in the United States
 List of United States federal law enforcement agencies
 List of United States state and local law enforcement agencies

References

District of Columbia

Law enforcement agencies